Mesuximide (or methsuximide, methosuximide) is a succinimide anticonvulsant medication. It is sold as a racemate by Pfizer under the tradenames Petinutin (Switzerland) and Celontin (United States). The therapeutic efficacy of methosuximide is largely due to its pharmacologically active metabolite, N-desmethylmethosuximide, which has a longer half-life and attains much higher plasma levels than its parent.

Medical use
is indicated for the control of absence seizures that are refractory to other drugs.

References

Anticonvulsants
Succinimides